KNFT (950 AM) is a radio station broadcasting an oldies format. Licensed to Bayard, New Mexico, United States, the station is currently owned by SkyWest Media, LLC, and the broadcast license is held by Skywest Licenses New Mexico, LLC.

References

External links

NFT
Oldies radio stations in the United States
Radio stations established in 1968
1968 establishments in New Mexico